Anisopodus subarmatus is a species of beetle in the family Cerambycidae that was described by Melzer in 1931.

References

Anisopodus
Beetles described in 1931